The Tyler Park Historic District encompasses a planned residential development in western Lowell, Massachusetts.  The development was designed by Olmsted, Olmsted and Eliot, and is centered on Tyler Park; this area is the only Olmsted design in the city. It is roughly bounded by Princeton, Foster, and Pine Streets.  Except for a few early houses that predate the subdivision, the area was built out between 1888 and 1936, and reflect the architectural styles popular in the period.

The district was listed on the National Register of Historic Places in 1989.

See also
National Register of Historic Places listings in Lowell, Massachusetts

References

Historic districts in Lowell, Massachusetts
National Register of Historic Places in Lowell, Massachusetts
Historic districts on the National Register of Historic Places in Massachusetts